The Prince and the Pauper is a lost 1915 silent film adventure starring Marguerite Clark based on the 1881 novel by Mark Twain. The film was produced by the Famous Players Film Company and was directed by Edwin S. Porter and Hugh Ford.

Plot
In this Mark Twain story of mistaken identity, Marguerite Clark plays two different young men, the well to do Prince of Wales and a poor boy of the streets.

Cast
 Marguerite Clark - Prince Edward/Tom Canty
 Robert Broderick - The King
 William Barrows - Earl of Hertford
 William Sorelle - Miles Hendon
 William Frederic - Tom Canty's Father
 Alfred Fisher - Father Andrew
 Nathaniel Sack -
 Edwin Mordant -

See also
 The House That Shadows Built (1931 promotional film by Paramount); a possibility that the unnamed Marguerite Clark clip is from The Prince and the Pauper.

References

External links
  The Prince and the Pauper @ IMDb.com
 AllMovie.com

1915 films
American silent feature films
Lost American films
Prince and the Pauper 1915
Films directed by Hugh Ford
Paramount Pictures films
1915 adventure films
American black-and-white films
American adventure films
1915 lost films
Lost adventure films
1910s American films
Silent adventure films